Kingborough Council is a local government body in Tasmania, and one of the five municipalities that constitutes the Greater Hobart Area. Kingborough is classified as an urban local government area and has a population of 37,734, it covers the transition from the southern urban areas of Hobart through Kingston, as well as encompassing Bruny Island.

Etymology
The origin of Kingborough Council is a simple derivation from the name of the main town. The name Kingston was suggested by Mr Lucas in 1851, and the area had been known as Brown's River before then. Why he suggested this name is unknown. Mr Lucas' parents had been raised in England near New Kingston, they had come from Norfolk Island where the capital was Kingston or it might have been named after the Governor of New Norfolk Philip Gidley King.

History
Europeans settled in the Kingborough Council's district in 1808 at Brown's River (Promenalinah), named after Robert Brown, botanist in 1804. The town and district were both known as Brown's River during the earliest periods of settlement. The Lucas family settled the area and built The Red House, a prominent mansion which is now Kingston Golf Club. Early Kingston developed primarily around The Red House. Development of Kingborough was slow and the first post office opened only in the 1840s. The first road to Hobart, Proctors Road, was opened in 1835.

Kingston was proclaimed a town in 1851. The town's name was suggested by the then Police Magistrate, a member of the Lucas family. By 1890 Kingston had a population of 249. When proclaimed on 20 August 1907, the Kingborough Municipality comprised 3 wards: Kingston, Margate and Longley. On 2 April 1993 Kingborough absorbed the former municipality of Bruny.

In 1877 Keen's Curry was invented in the municipality.

The area developed as a holiday area, especially the suburbs of Kingston Beach and Blackmans Bay. Margate and Kettering operated fishing fleets and Taroona created had a manufacturing industry, primarily through Taroona Shot Tower.  Sandfly became a center for small fruits and apple orcharding. The decline of the apple industry progresses during the 1960s, but the industry collapsed entirely following the 1967 Tasmanian fires, when much of the municipality was devastated and most orchards burnt down. A memorial to the 62 fatalities of the fire was constructed in Snug following the fire, where 80 of the towns 120 buildings burned and a permanent exhibition is present at the Channel Heritage Center.

Demographics
Localities and smaller towns of the region include Taroona, Kettering, Margate, Snug, Blackmans Bay and Woodbridge. Kingston is classified as urban, fringe and medium (UFM) under the Australian Classification of Local Governments.

Localities

Hobart suburbs
•	
•	
•	
•	
•	
•	
•

Other localities
•	
•	
•	
•	
•	
•	
•	
•	
•	
•	
•	
•	
•	
•	
•	
•	
•	
•	
•	
•	
•	
•	
•	
•	
•	
•	
•	
•	
•	
•	Pelverata
•	
•	
•	
•	
•	
•	
•

See also
List of local government areas of Tasmania

References

External links
Kingborough Council official website
Local Government Association Tasmania
Tasmanian Electoral Commission - local government

Local government areas of Tasmania
Southern Tasmania